Jonathan Edwards (September 27, 1798 – August 23, 1875) was an American lawyer and politician.

Edwards was born in Hartford, Connecticut, Sept. 27, 1798, and was the eldest son of Jonathan Walter Edwards (1772-1831), a distinguished lawyer of Hartford, son of the theologian Jonathan Edwards (1745-1801) and grandson of the famed American theologian and revivalist preacher Jonathan Edwards (1745–1801). His mother was Elizabeth, daughter of Capt. Moses Tryon, of Wethersfield, Conn.

He graduated from Yale College in 1819.  After leaving college, he studied law with Chief Justice Zephaniah Swift, of Windham, Conn., was admitted to the bar in 1824, and was for a few years a practicing attorney in Hartford. In 1830 he went to the island of Cuba to reside, but the death of his father in April, 1831, changed his plans, and induced him to return to his native city. In 1835 he was appointed by the Connecticut State Legislature judge of probate for the district of Hartford, and held the office for one year. In 1830 he was nominated by the Whigs for secretary of state, but was defeated, with all his associates on the ticket. He removed in 1838 to Troy, N. Y., where he was subsequently mayor of the city, and for two years (1854 and 1855) a member of the New York State Legislature.

He was married, March 1, 1837, to Maria Champion, of Colchester, Conn. Alter her death he removed in the spring of 1867 with his son to New Haven, Conn., where he spent the remainder of his life in invalid retirement. He died in this city, quite suddenly, of a congestive chill, Aug. 23, 1875, in his 77th year. His only son graduated Yale in 1863.

1798 births
1875 deaths
Politicians from Hartford, Connecticut
Connecticut lawyers
Members of the New York State Assembly
Yale College alumni
19th-century American politicians
Lawyers from Hartford, Connecticut
19th-century American lawyers